Alain Ndjoubi Ossami is a Gabonese politician and economist. He is the current national secretary of economy, finance, commerce and industry under the ruling Gabonese Democratic Party (Parti démocratique gabonais) (PDG).

References

Gabonese Democratic Party politicians
Gabonese economists
Living people
Year of birth missing (living people)
Government ministers of Gabon
21st-century Gabonese people